Niccolò Machiavelli (1469–1527) was an Italian political philosopher, musician, poet and romantic comedic playwright.

Machiavelli may also refer to:

 Machiavelli: The Prince, a computer game centered on trading and skullduggery
 Machiavelli (card game), the Dutch version of Citadels
 Machiavelli (Italian card game), a card game derived from Rummy 
 Machiavelli (board game), the Avalon Hill board game
 Machiavelli (surname), an Italian surname

See also
 Machiavel (band), a Belgian rock group
 Makaveli, a pseudonym adopted by the late American rapper Tupac Shakur